"A Watcher's Point of View (Don't 'Cha Think)" is a song by American musical group P.M. Dawn, released in May 1991 as a single from their debut album, Of the Heart, of the Soul and of the Cross: The Utopian Experience. It peaked at number 36 on the UK Singles Chart and number 44 on the US Billboard Hot Dance Music/Club Play chart in 1991. Song writing credit is given to Attrell Cordes (Prince Be of P.M. Dawn) and Tom Johnston of the Doobie Brothers as the song contains a sample of the Doobie Brothers' "Feelin' Down Farther".

Todd Terry's "Hard House Mix" of the song appeared on P.M. Dawn's 2000 compilation, The Best of P.M. Dawn. The song references "Pleasant Valley Sunday" by Gerry Goffin and Carole King, as performed by the Monkees in 1967.

Critical reception
Steve Huey from AllMusic stated that the song is "surprisingly funky and driving". Another editor, Hal Horowitz noted "the edgy hip-hop". Larry Flick from Billboard wrote, "Rap act deftly intermingles elements of raw hip-hop, Beatles-esque pop, and '70s-era funk. Icing on the cake is intelligent, well-paced rhymes; which makes this simply irresistible. Already hailed by U.K. critics and consumers, cut deserves immediate attention at urban and pop radio."

Charts

References

1991 singles
1991 songs
Island Records singles
P.M. Dawn songs
Songs written by Tom Johnston (musician)
Songs written by Attrell Cordes